Washington Ramirez Cruz Santos (born November 22, 1987 in Ribeira do Pombal), better known as just Ramirez, is a Brazilian football midfielder who currently plays for Náutico.

External links
  Ogol
  Soccerway

1987 births
Living people
Association football forwards
Brazilian footballers
Santa Cruz Futebol Clube players